Michael Jude Byrnes (born August 23, 1958) is an American prelate of the Roman Catholic Church who has been serving as archbishop of the Archdiocese of Agaña in Guam since 2019.  He previously served as an auxiliary bishop of the Archdiocese of Detroit in Michigan from 2011 to 2016.

Biography

Early life 
Born in Detroit, Michigan, on August 23, 1958, Michael Ryan  graduated from Detroit Catholic Central High School. 

Byrnes was ordained to the priesthood by Cardinal Adam Maida on May 25, 1996, for the Archdiocese of Detroit. Beginning in 2004, he served as vice rector of Sacred Heart Major Seminary in Detroit as well as a parish pastor.

Auxiliary Bishop of Detroit

On March 22, 2011, Ryan was appointed titular bishop of Eguga and auxiliary bishop of the Archdiocese of Detroit. He was consecrated by Archbishop Allen Henry Vigneron on May 5, 2011.

Coadjutor Archbishop and Archbishop of Agaña
On October 31, 2016, Byrnes was appointed by Pope Francis as coadjutor archbishop with special faculties of the Archdiocese of Agaña. He was installed as coadjutor archbishop on November 30. 

Although Archbishop Anthony Apuron of Agaña was found guilty on charges of the sexual abuse of minors by an Apostolic Tribunal of the Congregation for the Doctrine of the Faith on March 16, 2018, he was only suspended from the exercise of his authority over the archdiocese and retained his title pending the outcome of his appeals. Byrnes succeeded to the position of archbishop in everything except title at that time.

Byrnes automatically became archbishop of Agaña on April 4, 2019, when Apuron lost his title, having exhausted his appeals. On April 6, the Holy See Press Office confirmed that Byrnes had succeeded to the office of archbishop at the conclusion of judicial proceedings against Apuron.

See also

 Catholic Church hierarchy
 Catholic Church in the United States
 Historical list of the Catholic bishops of the United States
 List of Catholic bishops of the United States
 Lists of patriarchs, archbishops, and bishops

References

External links

Roman Catholic Archdiocese of Agaña Official Site

1958 births
Living people
Clergy from Detroit
21st-century Roman Catholic archbishops in the United States
Roman Catholic Archdiocese of Detroit
Religious leaders from Michigan
American Roman Catholic bishops by contiguous area of the United States
Roman Catholic archbishops of Agaña